Northam Road is a major thoroughfare along the northern coast of the city of George Town in Penang, Malaysia. It continues on from Gurney Drive towards Farquhar Street to the east. The road is a one-way road, with the traffic directed eastwards towards Farquhar Street. Since the 1990s, Northam Road, along with Gurney Drive, has also emerged as George Town's second Central Business District.

In the olden days, the northern coast of George Town was simply known as the 'North Beach'.  British administrators, including the founder of Penang, Francis Light, were buried within the Old Protestant Cemetery near the eastern end of Northam Road. The road gradually became the address of choice for the Europeans, and later, Chinese tycoons, who built elegant mansions along the road. As a result, Northam Road was also known as the Millionaire's Row by the locals.

Northam Road is also home to some of the tallest skyscrapers in Penang, many of which house commercial enterprises like banks, insurance firms, property and car dealers, and other businesses.

Naming 

Northam Road was originally named after Northam, Devon, in southwest England. It was officially renamed as Jalan Sultan Ahmad Shah in the 1980s, in honour of the then King of Malaysia, Sultan Ahmad Shah, who visited Penang in 1982. Nonetheless, local Penangites continue to refer to the road by its colonial name, Northam Road. This is partly because the new name sounds unwieldy, but also reflects a strong conservatism among the locals, who view Penang's colonial history as part of their local identity.

History 

During the early years of British rule, British officers and other Europeans were buried within the Old Protestant Cemetery. These included Captain Francis Light, who founded Penang in 1786 and died in 1794. At the time, Northam Road had yet to come into existence and the area was simply known as the 'North Beach'.

Throughout the 19th century, Northam Road evolved into the suburban area of choice for wealthy Europeans, who began building bungalows along the road. The Europeans later moved out of Northam Road for greener, leafy neighbourhoods further inland, leaving the bungalows along the road to be snapped up by Chinese businessmen, who in turn constructed more elegant bungalows along the road. Many of the wealthy Chinese who resided along Northam Road, such as Yeap Chor Ee, Loh Boon Siew and Lim Lean Teng, also chose European names for their residences, reflecting the upper-class preferences for all things European. 

In 1980, Northam Court, a 16-storey luxurious condominium project under construction was demolished just before completion when it began tilting and was at risk of collapse.

Since the 1990s, the mushrooming of commercial skyscrapers along Northam Road has turned the coastal thoroughfare into the city's second Central Business District, along with Gurney Drive. The construction of these skyscrapers have been made possible as the road technically lies outside the UNESCO World Heritage Site that covers most of the city centre.

Landmarks 
 Old Protestant Cemetery
 Kedah House, the residence of the Sultan of Kedah
 Homestead, formerly the residence of Yeap Chor Ee and now part of Wawasan Open University

Skyscrapers 

 Mansion One
 MBf Tower
 BHL Tower
 Sri Perdana Condominium

See also 
 List of roads in George Town
 Architecture of Penang
 George Town CBD

References 

Roads in Penang
George Town, Penang